San Joaquin Regional Transit District (known as "San Joaquin RTD" or simply as RTD) is a transit district that provides bus service to the city of Stockton, California and the surrounding communities of Lodi, Ripon, Thornton, French Camp, Lathrop, Manteca, and Tracy.

San Joaquin RTD operates 30 local fixed routes to the Stockton metropolitan area, including four Metro Express routes, RTD’s Bus Rapid Transit service. San Joaquin Regional Transit also operates seven Metro Hopper routes that provide fixed route and complimentary deviations for ADA certified passengers, five County Hopper routes that travel to neighboring cities in San Joaquin County. County Hoppers, like Metro Hoppers are fixed routes with complimentary deviations for ADA certified passengers. Finally, they operate Commuter services includes two routes that serve Sacramento and the East Bay (Dublin/Pleasanton’s BART station), with subscription service available for commuters.

History 

In 1963, legislative groundwork began for the establishment of a public transit special district in Stockton, and in 1965, the Stockton Metropolitan Transit District (SMTD) began providing service for the residents of Stockton. In late 1979, SMTD moved operations from Grant and Channel Streets to its current Lindsay Street facility. In 1985, SMTD adopted the nickname “SMART.” In 1990, SMART began providing fully accessible fixed route and Dial-A-Ride services for the elderly and persons with disabilities under the Americans with Disabilities Act (ADA) of 1990.
In 1994, enabling legislation expanded SMART’s service area to the San Joaquin County border, bringing with it a name change to reflect its expansion – San Joaquin Regional Transit District, or SJRTD for short. That same year, SJRTD expanded its Interregional Commuter service to offer additional routes to commuters traveling to the Bay Area and Sacramento. In 2004, SJRTD adopted “San Joaquin RTD” as its new corporate identity and developed a new logo. That same year, RTD introduced low-emission diesel-electric hybrid buses via its “Flower Bus,” with a full-wrap sunflower display designed to complement the slogan “A Breath of Fresh Air.” At the end of 2006, RTD opened the Downtown Transit Center for the public, with a floor for employee offices. In 2017, by converting its route 44 to electric buses, RTD became the first transit agency in the United States to operate a fully electric BRT route.

Access San Joaquin 
A consolidated transportation agency that was formed by local transit agencies and the San Joaquin Council of Governments in San Joaquin County, RTD was designated to be the CTSA for San Joaquin County. The local agencies that make up the board of the CTSA are:
 Escalon eTrans
 Ripon Blossom Express
 City of Lathrop
 City of Lodi Grapeline
 Manteca Transit
 Tracy Tracer
 RTD

Programs that are currently offered include:

 Centralized location for ADA Assessment for Paratransit (Dial-a-Ride) services for all transit agencies in the county.
Centralized location for Discount Fare Card assessment for senior citizens, people with disabilities and Medicare Card holders in the county.

 Access Pass (Formerly the FREEdom Program): Allows all ADA Paratransit qualified passengers to ride most fixed route services offered by transit agencies in the San Joaquin County. All passengers who have been certified through Access San Joaquin will receive a Photo ID card. Passengers will show this card to bus operators to board as paid fare.

 Discount Fare Cards: Available to those with disabilities and Senior Citizens (60 or older for residents those living in Stockton, Lodi or Ripon; 62 or older for residents of Manteca, 65 or older for residents living in Tracy and Escalon.

 Travel Training: Someone with extensive knowledge of the transportation agencies will work together with senior citizens and passengers with disabilities to learn how to use the fixed route systems.
 
 RTD Van Go!: RTD's own Ride Share or Mobility on Demand service, similar to RTD Go! Difference is that multiple passengers may ride in the same vehicle to different destinations. Currently serves the entire San Joaquin County The service hours are from:
 8:00 a.m. to 5:00 p.m. Weekdays and weekends

 My Ride: A fuel reimbursement program for ADA certified passengers, for traveling to medical appointments in the San Joaquin County. ADA certified passengers can use this service option to choose their family and or friends to take them to their medical appointments. Passenger and Driver complete waiver forms, once forms are turned in, they are enrolled in the program.

For more information visit the Access San Joaquin Web Page

RTD's active rolling stock

BRT Express 

BRT Express is RTD's express bus service and uses uniquely branded, low-emission diesel–electric hybrid buses that arrive at their stops every 15 minutes during weekday peak hours and every 30 minutes on weeknights, weekends, and holidays. BRT Express passengers are required to have a valid, pre-paid RTD bus pass or ticket to ride.  Fare vending machines, located at BRT Express stops and the Downtown Transit Center (DTC), are available for passengers to purchase single ride, day, and 31-day passes. BRT Express uses the same fare structure and passes as RTD’s regular fixed routes and passes issued by the Fare Vending Machines can be used on any of RTD's regular fixed routes.

The Downtown Transit Center (DTC) 

Completed December 2006, the DTC at 421 E. Weber St. has three off-street bus lanes, two passenger boarding platforms, and a two-story building.  Nearly all RTD routes connect at the DTC, which has 20 sheltered, off-street bus stops as well as additional street side stops on the north and south sides.  The DTC building incorporates the façades of three historic buildings (Hart & Thrift, Bower, and Delta) on its front elevation. The first floor of the DTC has a waiting area, public restrooms, and a customer service center where riders can get maps and schedules, purchase fares, and make customer comments.  RTD leases  of retail space for a restaurant on the east end, and a police satellite station provides the DTC with two RTD-contracted police officers.  A boardroom available for public meetings occupies the west end of the first floor and RTD administrative offices occupy the rest of the building. As of April 2, 2018, in partnership with RTD, Greyhound now uses the DTC as its Stockton, California stop.

On average, 6,000 people use the DTC each weekday.

All Electric Fleet arriving 2025 
In 2018 RTD introduced their first all-electric bus route. RTD plans to have a fleet of all electric buses by 2025. The current fleet of all-electric buses as of today, are manufactured by Proterra Inc.

Route List 
On March 11, 2018 RTD introduced a system wide change to their SMA routes, which included map, scheduling and numerical changes. RTD has also rebranded their Metro Express Service to BRT Express.

Stockton Metropolitan Area Service

Stockton Metropolitan Area (Limited Weekday Service) 
Some routes operated on a modified schedule

Metro Hopper Service (Weekdays Only)

Weekend Service

County Hopper Service (Weekdays Only) 
Rt 90,91,93,95 are operating on a limited bases due to lack of driver for over a year

Interregional Commuter Service (Weekdays only, excluding route 150)

References

External links 
 Access San Joaquin
 RTD Welcomes Greyhound to DTC
 National Express Transit to operate San Joaquin RTD services
 RTD Main Site
 RTD fired employees for Grand Jury testimony
 RTD Wins APTA Grand Award for Electronic Media
 Stockton Record, October 6, 2009 RTD Introduces Metro Hopper Service
 Grand Opening of RTD's Mall Transfer Station, April 23, 2009
 RTD's Response to the grand jury report
 Official Grand Jury Report
 Stockton Record, June 21, 2008 article detailing the grand jury report
 News 10, June 20, 2008 Interview
 Stockton Record, July 7, 2008 article about RTD's plans to increase fares across the board
 List of San Joaquin RTD routes and descriptions

Public transportation in the San Joaquin Valley Area
Bus transportation in California
Bus rapid transit in California
Public transportation in San Joaquin County, California
Public transportation in Stanislaus County, California
Public transportation in Alameda County, California
Transit agencies in California